Albertville 1992 (Arpitan: Arbèrtvile 1992) was a successful bid by Albertville, France, and the surrounding area of Savoie to host the 1992 Winter Olympics. The games were selected at the 91st IOC Session on 17 September 1986.

Outcome

References

1992 Winter Olympics bids
Sport in Albertville
1992